Ironworkers Memorial Bridge or Iron Workers' Memorial Bridge may refer to:

 Ironworkers Memorial Second Narrows Crossing, a bridge across the Burrard Inlet at Vancouver, British Columbia
 McClugage Bridge, a bridge across the Illinois River at Peoria, Illinois